Furtwangen University (HFU) is a German University of applied science with its main location in Furtwangen im Schwarzwald, Baden-Württemberg, Germany and two more branch locations in Villingen-Schwenningen and Tuttlingen. The HFU is part of the "International Lake Constance University Network" (IBH) as well as part of Franco-German University (FGU).

Its courses include health sciences, computer science, engineering, international economics, digital media, business informatics and industrial engineering.

History
Furtwangen University emerged from the first German School of Clockmaking in Furtwangen in the Black Forest. The school was founded in 1850 by the engineer Robert Gerwig. The German Clock Museum, the largest German watch collection (founded by Robert Gerwig as a display collection), is still a department of the University.

After the Second World War, the Furtwangen School of Clockmaking was divided into two branches: a vocational school (today the Robert Gerwig School, which still houses the Watchmaking School today) and the State Engineering School for Precision Engineering, which became the Furtwangen University of Applied Sciences (FHF) with the introduction of the universities of applied sciences in 1971.

The founding director of the engineering school was Friedrich Aßmus. After teaching and research in Furtwangen had concentrated on engineering sciences for a long time, the range of courses of study was expanded to include computer science, business informatics, economics and digital media from the 1970s onwards. In 1997, with the amendment of the State University Law of the State of Baden-Württemberg, it was first renamed "Hochschule für Technik und Wirtschaft" and later "Hochschule Furtwangen".

Currently, the university is headed by Rolf Schofer, who has been the rector of the HFU since 2006. His predecessor was Rainer Scheithauer. Scheithauer in turn took over the office in 1998 from Walter Zahradnik (term of office from 1985 to 1998).

Structure 
The president  is assisted by three vice-presidents. The University Council is responsible for the development of the university and proposes measures to raise the profile of the university and to strengthen its performance and competitiveness.

The three vice-presidents are Michael Lederer,Ulrich Mescheder and Robert Schäflein-Armbruster.

Campus Furtwangen
The Furtwangen campus is the university’s original location and includes the following faculties:

 Digital Media
 Health, Safety, Society
 Computer Science
 Mechanical and Medical Engineering
 Business Information Systems
 Business Administration and Engineering

Campus Villingen-Schwenningen
The Villingen-Schwenningen campus was established in 1988 and is located on the site of the former Kienzle watch factory. The following faculties are located here:

 Mechanical and Medical Engineering
 Medical and Life Sciences
 HFU Business School

Campus Tuttlingen
The Tuttlingen campus began operations in 2009 with about 121 students. It consists of only one faculty: Industrial Technologies.

The Faculty of Industrial Technologies trains students in medical engineering, mechatronics and digital production, engineering psychology and materials technology and manufacturing. In addition to four Bachelor's programs, the Faculty offers two Master's programs in Applied Materials Science and Mechatronic Systems as well as a technical orientation try-out semester and the Industrial Studies / Study Plus (Dual Form) at the HFU study location.

The campus is located on the former site of Henke-Sass, Wolf, which was built in 1906 and 1954. The brick building was renovated for over 10.5 million euros and officially inaugurated on 8 October 2009. In addition to the modernisation and an extension of the building, direct access to the central bus station (ZOB) was created. Possible extensions are the former building of the Ludwig-Uhland-Realschule or directly opposite another brick building from the Art Nouveau period.

A special element is the so-called "Tuttlingen Model" the cooperation between university, city, district and industry. The practice-oriented, cooperative study courses are supported by more than 100 local medical technology companies. A specially built Hochschulcampus Tuttlingen Förderverein e. V. has accelerated the creation of the campus.

The so-called Tuttlingen concept includes close cooperation with commercial enterprises, which guarantee permanent practical relevance through lecturers, demonstrations in companies, internships and the supervision of scientific work. The companies have a say in the design and operation of teaching. In total there is an annual financial support of 2.5 million euros from the business community, the district contributes 200,000 euros. The Campus' slogan is "Powered by Industry".

Study Center Freiburg 
In December 2016, the physiotherapy course moved into the new study centre in Freiburg, where part of the physiotherapy training will take place. The study centre is located in Konrad-Goldmann-Straße 7 in the Freiburg district Wiehre and is easily accessible by public transport.

On the first and second floors there are both classrooms and offices for the staff.  An expansion in the same building is already being planned.

Study Center Rottweil 
The Study Centre in Rottweil was reopened in March 2016. It is located in rooms of the former Rottweil powder factory, a place which already housed several powder mills during the Thirty Years' War. It offers space for the innovative plasma coating technologies of the Faculty Mechanical and Medical Engineering and a hall for the section mechanical engineering and industry 4.0 with state-of-the-art robots, automation technology and simulation.

In addition to university research with partly international research projects in the field of coatings for medical technology, there are also internships for students of the master's courses of studies in micromedical technology, advanced precision engineering and technical physician.

Furthermore, the facilities and equipment of the Study Center are available to students of the bachelor's degree programs for student research projects, project internships and bachelor's orthoses.

Fields of study and study programmes 
Since the winter semester 2001/2002, the entire range of courses has been converted to Bachelor and Master degrees, in accordance with the Bologna process. The university offers courses of study in nine faculties. Within seven semesters, a first professionally qualifying Bachelor's degree can be obtained, which enables graduates to successfully start their careers. This includes an internship semester in a company and the scientific thesis. The following table lists all study programmes by faculty (See also here):

Further Education 
The university has been active in scientific further education since 1996. Initially it offered online courses in the fields of media, computer science and economics under the so called service tele-akademie. Since 2010, it has expanded its range of courses to include attendance training and has bundled its further education activities in the now called HFU Academy.

HFU Academy offers continuing education courses that enable further education after initial professional experience. The topics offered are based on the profile of the university and are assigned to the fields of computer science, engineering, economics, digital media, health and other key qualifications. The variety of offered courses ranges from seminars and workshops lasting one or more days, online and blended learning to open courses or in-house training.

A special focus is also on services related to learning. Master's programmes open up new career perspectives and are designed as research or application-oriented postgraduate courses. They usually consist of three semesters and can be taken either directly after a first degree course or, after a certain amount of professional experience, as part-time studies while working.

International Orientation 
Students have the opportunity to study at one of 140 partner universities worldwide. Stays abroad and internships are an integral part of studying at the HFU. Through numerous activities in international teams with exciting tasks and projects, students experience team spirit and improve their intercultural competence. In addition, many courses of study are held in small, multinational groups.

In winter of 2018, Furtwangen University and Lakehead University decided to enter into a far-reaching collaboration. For HFU, this is already the third partnership in Canada, which has already been established with the University of New Brunswick and the University of Prince Edward Island. Michael Lederer, the Vice President for International Affairs and Continuing Education at HFU and Rüdiger Kukral of the Furtwangen Internship Placement Service (FIPS) signed the cooperation agreement; Lakehead President Moira McPherson has visited Furtwangen in the summer of 2019.

Student Life and Organisation 
Education in Germany is decentralised. The federal states independently take care of schools and universities and draw up their own laws and regulations. This also affects the student bodies of the universities. In Baden-Württemberg, the legal basis is the State University Act (German: Landeshochschulgesetz (LHG)). There the student organization is regulated, too. In 2013 the so-called constitutional student bodies were reintroduced in Baden-Württemberg. The constitutional student bodies are made up of all registered students of a university and are legally bound to the respective university as a public corporation and are therefore under the legal supervision of the university. They are largely independent and can decide on finances and student university policy themselves. They also represent the professional, social, economic and cultural interests of their members.

The executive body of the constitutional student body is the General Student Committee (German: Allgemeiner Studierendenausschuss (AStA)). This committee is mainly responsible for the organization, financing and control of the student leisure and sports activities at the HFU. In addition, there are festivities and other events in cooperation with the faculties' student bodies. Since the LHG does not take into account the particularities of several, distant locations of the HFU when re-introducing the student bodies, this presents the student self-administration with special challenges. In everyday life, communication and organisation across three locations and two learning centres is particularly affected.

The student life is, similar to the HFU, divided between the three locationsand and is concentrated at the respective locations. De facto, the AStA is also divided between the three locations and takes care of student affairs largely independent from the other parts of the HFU. In order to comply with the law, these "Campus-AStas" are only branches of the actual AStA, which operates across all three locations.

In close cooperation with the university, the Technology Department (German: AStA-Technik) at Campus Furtwangen is mostly responsible for the lighting and sound systems for many HFU events and for the university's own student events. In addition to accompanying graduation ceremonies of various faculties, the HFU half-marathon, the International Festival of the International Center and other events of the faculties are also supervised - including the Media Day (a kind of student work show) with the MediaNight in the evening, organized by the faculty of digital media at the end of semester. The event equipment is fully owned by the constituted student body and is only operated by selected members of the student body, organized in the Technology Department.

Alumni 

There are numerous alumni from this university but listing down is quite extensive job. Please check university's official website.

Weblink 

 Official website

References

External links
  Hs-furtwangen.de
  En.hs-furtwangen.de

Furtwangen
1971 establishments in Germany
Universities and colleges in Baden-Württemberg